The Nazi salute, also known as the Hitler salute (also called by the Nazi Party , 'German greeting'), or the Sieg Heil salute, is a gesture that was used as a greeting in Nazi Germany. The salute is performed by extending the right arm from the shoulder  into the air with a straightened hand. Usually, the person offering the salute would say "Heil Hitler!" (lit. 'Hail Hitler!'), "Heil, mein Führer!" ('Hail, my leader!'), or "Sieg Heil!" ('Hail victory!'). It was adopted in the 1930s by the Nazi Party to signal obedience to the party's leader, Adolf Hitler, and to glorify the German nation (and later the German war effort). The salute was mandatory for civilians but mostly optional for military personnel, who retained a traditional military salute until the failed assassination attempt on Hitler on 20 July 1944.

Use of this salute is illegal in modern-day Germany (Strafgesetzbuch section 86a) and Austria (Verbotsgesetz 1947), and is also considered a criminal offence in modern-day Poland and Slovakia. The use of any Nazi phrases associated with the salute is also forbidden. In Italy, it is a criminal offence only if used with the intent to "reinstate the defunct National Fascist Party", or to exalt or promote its ideology or members. In Canada and most of Europe (including the Czech Republic, France, the Netherlands, Sweden, Switzerland, the United Kingdom, Ukraine, and Russia), displaying the salute is not in itself a criminal offence, but constitutes hate speech if used for propagating the Nazi ideology.

Description

The salute was executed by extending the right arm stiff to an upward 45° angle and then straightening the hand so that it is parallel to the arm. Usually, an utterance of "Sieg Heil", "Heil Hitler!", or "Heil!" accompanied the gesture.
If one saw an acquaintance at a distance, it was enough to simply raise the right hand. If one encountered a superior, one would also say "Heil Hitler". If physical disability prevented raising the right arm, it was acceptable to raise the left.

Hitler gave the salute in two ways. When reviewing his troops or crowds, he generally used the traditional stiff-armed salute. When greeting individuals who saluted, he used a modified version of the salute, bending his right arm at a 90° angle with the elbow facing forward while holding an open hand with the bottom of the palm facing towards those greeted at shoulder height and the face of the palm parallel with the sky. It was also adopted by those with rank who would themselves be saluted.

Origins and adoption

The spoken greeting "Heil" became popular in the pan-German movement around 1900. It was used by the followers of Georg Ritter von Schönerer, head of the Austrian Alldeutsche Partei ("Pan-German Party") who considered himself leader of the Austrian Germans, and who was described by Carl E. Schorske as "The strongest and most thoroughly consistent anti-Semite that Austria produced" before the coming of Hitler.  Hitler took both the "Heil" greeting – which was popularly used in his "hometown" of Linz when he was a boy – and the title of "Führer" for the head of the Nazi Party from Schönerer,Kershaw (1999), pp. 34–35 whom he admired.

The extended arm saluting gesture is believed to be based on an ancient Roman custom, but no known Roman work of art depicts it, nor does any extant Roman text describe it. Jacques-Louis David's 1784 painting Oath of the Horatii displayed a raised arm salutatory gesture in an ancient Roman setting.Winkler (2009) pp. 42–44 The gesture and its identification with ancient Rome was advanced in other French neoclassic art.

In 1892, Francis Bellamy introduced the American Pledge of Allegiance, which was to be accompanied by a visually similar saluting gesture, referred to as the Bellamy salute.Because of the resemblance between the American Bellamy salute and the Nazi salute, it was replaced in 1942 by a hand-over-the-heart gesture to be used by civilians during the Pledge of Allegiance and the national anthem.  See: A raised arm gesture was then used in the 1899 American stage production of Ben-Hur, and its 1907 film adaptation. The gesture was further elaborated upon in several early Italian films. Of special note was the 1914 silent film Cabiria, whose screenplay had contributions from the Italian ultra-nationalist Gabriele d'Annunzio, arguably a forerunner of Italian Fascism. In 1919, when he led the occupation of Fiume, d'Annunzio used the style of salute depicted in the film as a neo-Imperialist ritual and the Italian Fascist Party quickly adopted it.

By autumn 1923, some members of the Nazi Party were using the rigid, outstretched right arm salute to greet Hitler, who responded by raising his own right hand crooked back at the elbow, palm opened upwards, in a gesture of acceptance. In 1926, the Nazi salute was made compulsory for all party members. It functioned as a display of commitment to the Party and a declaration of principle to the outside world. Gregor Strasser wrote in 1927 that the greeting in and of itself was a pledge of loyalty to Hitler, as well as a symbol of personal dependence on the Führer. Even so, the drive to gain acceptance did not go unchallenged.

Some party members questioned the legitimacy of the so-called Roman salute, employed by Fascist Italy, as un-Germanic. In response, efforts were made to establish its pedigree by inventing a tradition after the fact. In June 1928, Rudolf Hess published an article titled "The Fascist Greeting", which claimed that the gesture was used in Germany as early as 1921, before the Nazis had heard about the Italian Fascists. He admits in the article: "The NSDAP's introduction of the raised-arm greeting approximately two years ago still gets some people's blood boiling. Its opponents suspect the greeting of being un-Germanic. They accuse it of merely aping the [Italian] Fascists", but goes on to ask, "and even if the decree from two years ago [Hess' order that all party members use it] is seen as an adaption of the Fascist gesture, is that really so terrible"? Ian Kershaw points out that Hess did not deny the likely influence from Fascist Italy, even if indeed the salute had been used sporadically in 1921 as Hess claimed.

On the night of 3 January 1942, Hitler said of the origins of the salute:

Nazi chants

Nazi chants like "Heil Hitler!" and "Sieg Heil!" were prevalent across Nazi Germany, sprouting in mass rallies and even regular greetings alike.

In Nazi Germany, the Nazi chants "Heil Hitler!" and "Sieg Heil!" were the formulas used by the regime: when meeting someone it was customary to greet with the words "Heil Hitler!", while "Sieg Heil!" was a verbal salute used at mass rallies. Specifically to the cry of an officer of the word Sieg ('victory'), the crowd responded with Heil ('hail'). For example, at the 1934 Nuremberg Rally, Rudolf Hess ended his climactic speech with the words "The Party is Hitler. But Hitler is Germany, just as Germany is Hitler. Hitler! Sieg Heil!" At his total war speech delivered in 1943, audiences shouted "Sieg Heil!", as Joseph Goebbels solicited from them "a kind of plebiscitary 'Ja to total war (ja meaning 'yes' in German).

On 11 March 1945, less than two months before the capitulation of Nazi Germany, a memorial for the dead of the war was held in Marktschellenberg, a small town near Hitler's Berghof residence. The British historian Ian Kershaw remarks that the power of the Führer cult and the "Hitler Myth" had vanished, which is evident from this report:

The Swing Youth were a group of middle-class teenagers who consciously separated themselves from Nazism and its culture, greeting each other with "Swing-Heil!" and addressing one another as "old-hot-boy". This playful behaviour was dangerous for participants in the subculture; on 2 January 1942, Heinrich Himmler ordered that the leaders be put in concentration camps to be drilled and beaten.

The form "Heil, mein Führer!" ('Hail, my Leader!') was for direct address to Hitler, while "Sieg Heil" was repeated as a chant on public occasions. Written communications would be concluded with either "mit deutschem Gruß" ("with German regards"), or with "Heil Hitler". In correspondence with high-ranking Nazi officials, letters were usually signed with "Heil Hitler".

From 1933 to 1945

Under a decree issued by Reich Minister of the Interior Wilhelm Frick on 13 July 1933 (one day before the ban on all non-Nazi parties), all German public employees were required to use the salute. The decree also required the salute during the singing of the national anthem and the "Horst-Wessel-Lied". It stipulated that "anyone not wishing to come under suspicion of behaving in a consciously negative fashion will therefore render the Hitler Greeting," and its use quickly spread as people attempted to avoid being labelled as a dissident. A rider to the decree, added two weeks later, stipulated that if physical disability prevented raising of the right arm, "then it is correct to carry out the Greeting with the left arm." On 27 September, prison inmates were forbidden to use the salute, as were Jews by 1937.

By the end of 1934, special courts were established to punish those who refused to salute. Offenders, such as Protestant preacher Paul Schneider, faced the possibility of being sent to a concentration camp. Foreigners were not exempt from intimidation if they refused to salute. For example, the Portuguese Consul General was beaten by members of the Sturmabteilung for remaining seated in a car and not saluting a procession in Hamburg. Reactions to inappropriate use were not merely violent but sometimes bizarre. For example, a memo dated 23 July 1934 sent to local police stations stated: "There have been reports of traveling vaudeville performers training their monkeys to give the German Greeting. ... see to it that said animals are destroyed."

The salute soon became part of everyday life, a historically unique phenomenon that politicised all communication in Germany for twelve years, superseding all prior forms of greeting, such as "Grüß Gott" ("Hello"), "Guten Tag" ("Good day"), and "Auf Wiederseh(e)n" ("Goodbye"). Postmen used the greeting when they knocked on people's doors to deliver packages or letters. Small metal signs that reminded people to use the Hitler salute were displayed in public squares and on telephone poles and street lights throughout Germany. Department store clerks greeted customers with "Heil Hitler, how may I help you?" Dinner guests brought glasses etched with the words "Heil Hitler" as house gifts. The salute was required of all persons passing the Feldherrnhalle in Munich, site of the climax of the 1923 Beer Hall Putsch, which the government had made into a shrine to the Nazi dead; so many pedestrians avoided this mandate by detouring through the small Viscardigasse behind that the passage acquired the nickname "Dodgers' Alley" (Drückebergergasse). The daughter of the American Ambassador to Germany, Martha Dodd, describes the first time she saw the salute:

Children were indoctrinated at an early age. Kindergarten children were taught to raise their hand to the proper height by hanging their lunch bags across the raised arm of their teacher. At the beginning of first grade primers was a lesson on how to use the greeting. The greeting found its way into fairy tales, including classics like Sleeping Beauty. Students and teachers would salute each other at the beginning and end of the school day, between classes, or whenever an adult entered the classroom.

In 1935, at the end of Hans Spemann’s acceptance speech for the Nobel Prize, he gave a Nazi salute.

Some athletes used the Nazi salute in the opening ceremony of the 1936 Berlin Olympics as they passed by Hitler in the reviewing stand. This was done by delegates from Afghanistan, Bermuda, Bulgaria, Bolivia, France, Greece, Iceland, Italy and Turkey. The Bulgarian athletes performed the Nazi salute and broke into a goose-step; Turkish athletes maintained the salute all around the track. There is some confusion over the use of the salute, since the stiff-arm Nazi salute could have been mistaken for an Olympic salute, with the right arm held out at a slight angle to the right from the shoulder. According to the American sports writer Jeremy Schaap, only half of the athletes from Austria performed a Nazi salute, while the other half gave an Olympic salute. According to the historian Richard Mandell, there are conflicting reports on whether athletes from France performed a Nazi salute or an Olympic Salute. In football, the England football team bowed to pressure from the British Foreign Office and performed the salute during a friendly match on 14 May 1938.

Jehovah's Witnesses came into conflict with the Nazi regime because they refused to salute Adolf Hitler with the Nazi salute, believing that it conflicted with their worship of God. Because refusing to salute Hitler was considered a crime, Jehovah's Witnesses were arrested, and their children attending school were expelled, detained and separated from their families.

Military use

The Wehrmacht refused to adopt the Hitler salute officially and was able for a time to maintain its customs. A compromise edict from the Reich Defense Ministry, issued on 19 September 1933, required the Hitler salute of soldiers and uniformed civil servants while singing the "Horst-Wessel-Lied" and national anthem, and in non-military encounters both within and outside the Wehrmacht (for example, when greeting members of the civilian government). At all other times they were permitted to use their traditional salutes. However, according to (pre-Nazi) Reichswehr and Wehrmacht protocol, the traditional military salute was prohibited when the saluting soldier was not wearing a uniform headgear (helmet or cap). Because of this, all bareheaded salutes used the Nazi salute, making it de facto mandatory in most situations.

Full adoption of the Hitler salute by the military was discussed in January 1944 at a conference regarding traditions in the military at Hitler's headquarters. Field Marshal Wilhelm Keitel, head of the Armed Forces, had expressed a desire to standardize the salute across all organizations in Germany. On 23 July 1944, several days after the failed assassination attempt, Goebbels suggested to Hitler that the military be ordered to fully adopt the Hitler salute as a show of loyalty, since Army officers had been responsible for the assassination attempt. Hitler approved the suggestion without emotion, and the order went into effect on 24 July 1944.

On the night of 3 January 1942, Hitler stated the following about the compromise edict of 1933:

Satiric responses
Despite indoctrination and punishment, the salute was ridiculed by some people. Since heil is also the imperative of the German verb heilen ('to heal'), a common joke in Nazi Germany was to reply with, "Is he sick?" "Am I a doctor?" or "You heal him!" Jokes were also made by distorting the phrase. For example, "Heil Hitler" might become "Ein Liter" ('One liter') or "Drei Liter" ('Three Liter').
Cabaret performer Karl Valentin would quip, "It's lucky that Hitler's name wasn't 'Kräuter'. Otherwise, we'd have to go around yelling Heilkräuter ('medicinal herbs')". Similar puns were made involving "-bronn" (rendering "Heilbronn", the name of a German city), and "-butt" (rendering "Heilbutt", the German word for 'halibut').

Satirical use of the salute dates back to anti-Nazi propaganda in Germany before 1933. In 1932, photomontage artist John Heartfield used Hitler's modified version, with the hand bent over the shoulder, in a poster that linked Hitler to Big Business. A giant figure representing right-wing capitalists stands behind Hitler, placing money in his hand, suggesting "backhand" donations. The caption is, "the meaning of the Hitler salute" and "Millions stand behind me". Heartfield was forced to flee in 1933 after the Nazi seizure of power in Germany.

Another example is a cartoon by New Zealand political cartoonist David Low, mocking the Night of the Long Knives. Run in the Evening Standard on 3 July 1934, it shows Hitler with a smoking gun grimacing at terrified SA men with their hands up. The caption reads: "They salute with both hands now". When Achille Starace proposed that Italians should write  in letters, Mussolini wrote an editorial in Il Popolo d'Italia mocking the idea.

Post-1945
Today in Germany, Nazi salutes in written form, vocally, and even straight-extending the right arm as a saluting gesture (with or without the phrase), are illegal. The offence is punishable by up to three years in prison (Strafgesetzbuch section 86a). Usage for art, teaching and science is allowed unless "the existence of an insult results from the form of the utterance or the circumstances under which it occurred." Use of the salute, or any phrases associated with the salute, has also been illegal in Austria since the end of World War II.

In Germany, usage that is "ironic and clearly critical of the Hitler Greeting" is exempt, which has led to legal debates as to what constitutes ironic use. One case involved Prince Ernst August of Hanover who was brought to court after using the gesture as a commentary on the behavior of an unduly zealous airport baggage inspector. On 23 November 2007, the Amtsgericht Cottbus sentenced Horst Mahler to six months of imprisonment without parole for having, according to his own claims, ironically performed the Hitler salute when reporting to prison for a nine-month term a year earlier. The following month, a pensioner named Roland T was given a prison term of five months for, amongst other things, training his dog Adolf to raise his right paw in a Nazi salute every time the command "Heil Hitler!" was uttered.

The Supreme Court of Switzerland ruled in 2014 that Nazi salutes do not breach hate crime laws if expressed as one's personal opinion, but only if they are used in attempt to propagate Nazi ideology.

Modified versions of the salute are sometimes used by neo-Nazis. One such version is the so-called "Kühnen salute" with extended thumb, index and middle finger, which is also a criminal offence in Germany. In written correspondence, the number 88 is sometimes used by some neo-Nazis as a substitute for "Heil Hitler" ("H" as the eighth letter of the alphabet). Swiss neo-Nazis were reported to use a variant of the Kühnengruss, though extending one's right arm over their head and extending said three fingers has a different historical source for Switzerland, as the first three Eidgenossen or confederates are often depicted with this motion. Hezbollah supporters in Lebanon often raise their arms in a Nazi-style salute.

The Afrikaner Weerstandsbeweging, a South African neo-Nazi organization known for its militant advocacy of white separatism, has espoused brown uniforms as well as Nazi German-esque flags, insignia, and salutes at meetings and public rallies. Hundreds of supporters in 2010 delivered straight-arm salutes outside the funeral for AWB leader Eugène Terre'Blanche, who was murdered by two black farm workers over an alleged wage dispute.

On 28 May 2012, BBC current affairs programme Panorama examined the issues of racism, antisemitism and football hooliganism, which it claimed were prevalent among Polish and Ukrainian football supporters. The two countries hosted the international football competition UEFA Euro 2012.

On 16 March 2013, Greek footballer Giorgos Katidis of AEK Athens F.C. was handed a life ban from the Greek national team for performing the salute after scoring a goal against Veria F.C. in Athens' Olympic Stadium.

On 18 July 2015, The Sun published an image of the British Royal Family from private film shot in 1933 or 1934, showing Princess Elizabeth (the future Queen, then a young girl) and the Queen Mother both performing a Nazi salute, accompanied by Edward VIII, taken from 17 seconds of home footage (also released by The Sun). The footage ignited controversy in the UK, and there have been questions as to whether the release of this footage was appropriate. Buckingham Palace described the release of this footage as "disappointing", and considered pursuing legal action against The Sun, whereas Stig Abell (managing director of The Sun) said that the footage was "a matter of national historical significance to explore what was going on in the [1930s] ahead of the Second World War". Abell responded to criticism by assuring that The Sun was not suggesting "anything improper on the part of the Queen or indeed the Queen Mum".

American white supremacist Richard B. Spencer drew considerable media attention in the weeks following the 2016 U.S. presidential election, where, at a National Policy Institute conference, he quoted from Nazi propaganda and denounced Jews. In response to his cry "Hail Trump, hail our people, hail victory!", a number of his supporters gave the Nazi salute and chanted in a similar fashion to the Sieg Heil chant.

CNN fired political commentator Jeffrey Lord on 10 August 2017, after he tweeted "Sieg Heil!" to Angelo Carusone, president of Media Matters for America, suggesting Carusone was a fascist.

In August 2021, a Michigan man named Paul Marcum gave the Nazi salute during a dispute over mask mandates and was fired from his job as a tennis instructor after Birmingham Public Schools announced that it would not tolerate any acts of racism, disrespect, violence, or inequitable treatment of any person.

Incidents involving North American students
In May 2018, students at Baraboo High School, in Baraboo, Wisconsin, appeared to perform a Nazi salute in a photograph taken before their junior prom.  The image went viral on social media six months later, sparking outrage.  The school decided the students could not be punished because of their First Amendment rights.

In November 2018, a group of students of Pacifica High School of Garden Grove Unified School District in California were shown in a video giving the Nazi salute and singing Erika.  The incident took place at an after-hours off-campus student athletics banquet.  The school administration did not learn about the incident until March 2019, at which time the students were disciplined.  The school did not release details of what the discipline entailed, but released a statement saying that they would continue to deal with the incident "in collaboration with agencies dedicated to anti-bias education." On 20 August 2019, the school district announced that it was reopening the investigation into the incident because new photographs and another video has surfaced of the event, along with "new allegations" and "new claims".  Parents and teachers criticized the school's administration for their initial secrecy about the incident, for which the school's principal apologized.

In March 2019, students from Newport Beach, California, attending a private party made a swastika from red-and-white plastic party cups and gave Nazi salutes over it. Some of the students may have been from Newport Harbor High School of Newport-Mesa Unified School District, a very large district which encompasses 58 square miles and includes the cities of Newport Beach and Costa Mesa. Officials from the district condemned the students' behavior, and said they were working with law enforcement to collect information on the incident.

On February 1, 2022, one of the pupils from Charles H. Best Middle School in North York, a district in Toronto, Ontario, Canada, performed a Nazi salute to a Jewish student while another who allegedly built a swastika, which led to the Toronto District School Board to launch an investigation and further condemnation by the Simon Wiesenthal Center.

Ku Klux Klan
Among other gestures used by the Ku Klux Klan, the "Klan salute" is similar to the Nazi salute, the difference being that it is performed using the left arm and not the right, and that often the fingers of the hand are splayed and not held tightly together.  The four fingers represent the four Ks in "Knights of the Ku Klux Klan".  According to the Anti-Defamation League, the Klan salute dates to 1915.

In popular culture
 In a running gag in Hogan's Heroes, Colonel Klink often forgets to give the Hitler salute at the end of a phone call; instead, he usually asks, "What's that?" and then says, "Yes, of course, Heil Hitler". In the German-language version of the show, called Ein Käfig voller Helden (A Cage Full of Heroes), Col. Klink and Sgt. Schultz have rural Gomer Pyle-type accents, and stiff-armed salutes are accompanied by such witticisms as: "this is how high the cornflowers grow". The "Heil Hitler" greeting was the variant most often used and associated with the series; "Sieg Heil" was rarely heard.
 A related gesture was used by the fictional Nazi-affiliated organization Hydra from Marvel Comics, with both arms outstretched, clenched fists and the phrase "Hail Hydra" uttered by members of the organization.
 On the American animated TV sitcom Family Guy, a "Cheesie Charlie's" worker dressed up as a devil welcomed both Peter and Chris to the "dungeon", who performs the Nazi salute shortly after welcoming the two characters (Season 1, Episode 3, "Chitty Chitty Death Bang", first broadcast: April 18, 1999). In another episode, a previously-appearing unnamed character, Quahog's town librarian, is drafted by a committee of townspeople to run for mayor.  None of them knows her name, and she introduces herself as "Elle Hitler" ("no relation," she says), and they all stand, extend their arms to salute her with their drinks, and say "Hi, Elle Hitler!" (Season 19, Episode 7, "Wild Wild West", first broadcast: November 22, 2020).

See also

 Ave
 Bellamy salute
 Bras d'honneur
 Heil og sæl
 Quenelle (gesture) 
 Raised fist
 Roman salute
 Zogist salute
 Wolf salute

References
Informational notes

Citations

Bibliography

External links

1923 introductions
Adolf Hitler
Fascism
Fascist symbols
Hand gestures
Nazi symbolism
Salutes
Symbols of Nazi Germany